The 2000 Cincinnati Bearcats football team represented the University of Cincinnati in the 2000 NCAA Division I-A football season. The team, coached by Rick Minter, played its home games in Nippert Stadium, as it has since 1924.

Schedule

Roster

Awards and milestones

All-Americans
Jonathan Ruffin, K

Players in the 2001 NFL Draft

References

Cincinnati
Cincinnati Bearcats football seasons
Cincinnati Bearcats football